The 1978 Spillers Greyhound Derby took place during May, June and July  with the final being held on 1 July 1978 at White City Stadium.  
The winner was Lacca Champion and the winning owners Paul Howell, Sandra Howell and David Hill received a record £20,000. The competition was sponsored by the Spillers.

Final result 
At White City (over 500 metres):

Distances 
1¾, 2½, head, 1½, ¾ (lengths)
The distances between the greyhounds are in finishing order and shown in lengths. One length is equal to 0.08 of one second.

Competition Report
The Derby attracted a significant number of runners from Ireland with 21 of the 163 hopefuls making the journey. The first round was held at different tracks which proved unpopular. Scurry Gold Cup champion Jet Control ran in a heat the night after winning the Laurels.

Ante-post favourite Witchs Champion went out in round two and Heres Tat ran well below expectation but the Ger McKenna trained greyhound retained the overall favouritism. The Pat and Linda Mullins pair of Lacca Champion and Paradise Spectre both progressed as did Balliniska Band. The erratic Glen Rock who had recorded the fastest trial of the year at the track (29.47) also progressed but failed at the quarter final stage.

The third round ended the challenge of defending champion Balliniska Band following two dislocated toes. The fastest heat winner was Geoff De Mulder's Dale Lad in a time of 29.30. The quarter-finals resulted in another win for Lacca Champion who remained unbeaten and Irish sprinter Glenroe Hiker led all the way in his heat but Paradise Spectre went out.

The long format of the competition now meant that the semifinals would be the fifth run for the greyhounds. The first semi resulted in a fifth win for Lacca Champion after he matched the early pace of Glenroe Hiker out of the traps; All Wit took third place. In the second semi Mulcair Rocket the 6-4f trained by Emil Kovac missed the break leaving Superior Model winning from Backdeed Man and Great Ali.

Six contenders lined up for the final and Lacca Champion was sent off 6-4 favourite. Out of the traps he was led by Glenroe Hiker, but Lacca Champion maintained his challenge and went on to win from Backdeed Man in 29.42sec, with the early leader fading into fifth. Lacca Champion had gone through the Derby unbeaten with the added anomaly of winning his first round heat at Harringay Stadium.

Quarter-finals

Semifinals

See also
1978 UK & Ireland Greyhound Racing Year

References

Greyhound Derby
English Greyhound Derby
English Greyhound Derby